Dawns Are Kissing is a 1978 Soviet comedy film directed by Sergey Nikonenko.

Plot 
The film tells about the collective farmer and tractor driver who go to the city and end up in various ridiculous situations.

Cast 
 Boris Saburov
 Ivan Ryzhov
 Andrey Smolyakov
 Mariya Skvortsova	
 Yelena Rubtsova
 Ekaterina Voronina		
 Anatoliy Pereverzev
 Mikhail Kokshenov
 Boris Levinson
 Sergey Nikonenko

References

External links 
 

1978 films
1970s Russian-language films
Soviet comedy films
1978 comedy films